2003–04 Hong Kong FA Cup was the 30th staging of the Hong Kong FA Cup. The cup was won by Happy Valley who won 3-1 against Kitchee in the final.

The competition started on 27 April 2004 with 10 Hong Kong First Division clubs. Four of them took part in the first round to determine which team advanced to the quarter finals. From quarter finals onward, the cup competition was a single-elimination tournament. Although all the matches before the final was held at the Mongkok Stadium, the final was staged at the Hong Kong Stadium on 9 May 2004.

The competition was officially known as 2003/04 HKFA Dongguan Centurycity Real Estate FA Cup due to sponsorship from Dongguan Centurycity Real Estate Development Limited.

Teams
 Buler Rangers
 Fire Services
 Fukien
 Happy Valley
 Kitchee
 Nancheng Real Estate
 South China
 Sun Hei
 Sunray Cave
 Xiangxue Pharmaceutical

Fixtures and results
All times are Hong Kong Time (UTC+8).

Bracket

First round

Quarter-finals

Semi-finals

Final

Goalscorers

Prizes

Team awards
 Champion (HK$150,000): Happy Valley

Individual awards
 Top Scorer Award (HK$5,000 in total):  Gerard,  Martin Jancula,  Cheung Sai Ho (Happy Valley),  Marcio,  Julius Akosah (Sun Hei)
 Best Defender Award (HK$5,000):  Lee Wai Man (Happy Valley)

References

External links

2003-04
2004 domestic association football cups
2003–04 in Hong Kong football